Simple Songs is the eighth album by Steve Bell.  The album won the Juno Award for Best Gospel Album of the Year at the Juno Awards of 2001.

Simple Songs also won the award for Outstanding Christian Recording at the 2001 Prairie Music Awards.  Steve Bell and Dave Zeglinski shared the Outstanding Producer award for the album.

Personnel
 Steve Bell - guitar, mandolin, vocals
 Sarah Bell - lead vocal on "Unto the Least of These"
 Jesse Bell - second guitar on "We Come"

Related
Song Book, Simple Songs (2000)

Track listing
 "God Our Protector" - 3:10
 "Home" - 3:47 (Joseph Brauen)
 "High Above the Fray" - 4:13
 "Fox Glove" - 2:24 (Bruce Cockburn)
 "All the Diamonds" - 2:36 (Bruce Cockburn)
 "Down the Way" - 2:14
 "Done Made My Vow to the Lord" - 3:30 (anon.)
 "What Kind of Love is This" - 2:36 (Bryn & Sally Hayworth)
 "Unto The Least of These" - 4:35 (Mary-Kathryn)
 "Fresh and Green" - 2:33
 "Peace Prayer" - 3:23 (John Foley)
 "Come Thou Long Expected Jesus / Be Thou My Vision / Great Is Thy Faithfulness" - 5:28 (Rowland Pritchard, anon., and William M. Runyan)
 "We Come" - 3:09 (David Adam and Jim Croegaert)
 "For the Journey" - 3:00

Words and music by Steve Bell except where noted.

References 

Steve Bell (musician) albums
2000 albums
Juno Award for Contemporary Christian/Gospel Album of the Year albums